My Crew, My Dawgs is the debut album by T.O.K., released in 2001.

Track listing 
 All songs by R. Clarke, Xavier Davidson, A. McCalla, and C. Thompson unless otherwise indicated.

 "Prophecy" [Intro] — 1:40
 "Man Ah Bad Man" — 2:53
 "Chi-Chi Man" — 3:24
 "Gimmi Da Muzik" — 3:19
 "The Way U Do the Things U Do" [Accapella Interlude] (Smokey Robinson, Robert Rogers) — 0:49
 "Money 2 Burn" — 3:33
 "Mona Lisa" [2002 Stylee] — 3:55
 "All Day" — 3:45
 "Ghetto Youths Anthem" [Interlude] — 0:39
 "Keep It Blazing" — 3:23
 "Eagles Cry" — 2:31
 "Gun Shy" — 3:01
 "You Ah Murder" — 2:49
 "On the Radio" — 3:10
 "Watch & Protect" [Interlude] — 0:19
 "I Believe" (Jeff Pence, Eliot Sloan) — 3:49
 "Shake Yuh Bam Bam" — 2:42
 "Saturday" — 3:45
 "Alone" — 2:56
 "Somebody's Watching Me" [hidden track] — 3:57

The Japan Edition (released in 2002) includes two bonus tracks between the tracks "Alone" and "Somebody's Watchin' Me (Creepin')":

 "Bad Man Anthem"
 "Girlz Girlz"

References

External links 
 http://www.vprecords.com
 http://www.tokworld.com
 https://web.archive.org/web/20110707113749/http://www.allreggaelyrics.com/IndexSongList.php?id=T.O.K.
 http://music.yahoo.com/release/24603436

2001 debut albums
T.O.K. albums
VP Records albums